Lyric Theater, also known as Thespian Hall, is a historic theatre in Boonville, Cooper County, Missouri. It was built in 1855–1857, and is a two-story, rectangular Greek Revival–style brick building.  The front facade features a portico with four unfluted Doric columns constructed of wedge-shaped brick.  The building was enlarged in 1901.  When originally constructed, the basement was used as reading room, the main floor was used as combined theater and lecture hall or auditorium, and the second floor housed the city hall, a Masonic lodge, and an Odd Fellows hall.

It was listed on the National Register of Historic Places in 1969. It is located in Historic District D.

References

Individually listed contributing properties to historic districts on the National Register in Missouri
Theatres on the National Register of Historic Places in Missouri
Greek Revival architecture in Missouri
Theatres completed in 1857
National Register of Historic Places in Cooper County, Missouri
1857 establishments in Missouri
Boonville, Missouri